This list is intended as a quick reference for locations mentioned in the Book of Mormon.

 - See also

A
 City of Aaron, Alma's planned destination after rejection in Ammonihah
 Ablom, Refuge for Omer and his Family
 Plains of Agosh, Jaredite battle area
 Aiath, Also known as Ai (Bible) (possibly Et-Tell)
 Wilderness of Akish, Jaredite Refuge and Battle Area
 Valley of Alma, Rest stop for Alma and his Followers
 City of Ammonihah, Wicked Nephite City, 'Desolation of Nehors'
 Hill Amnihu, Site of the Initial Amlicite Strike
 Land of Amulon, Settled by Amulon and priests, between Zarahemla and Nephi
 Anathoth, Levite city near old Jerusalem
 Angola, Retreat for Mormon's Army
 Ani-Anti, Lamanite village visited by Nephite Missionaries
 Land of Antionum, Home of the Zoramites, visited by Nephite Missionaries
 Antiparah, City captured by the Lamanites and Regained by Helaman and Antipus
 Mount Antipas, Gathering place for Lehonti and the peaceful Lamanites
 Land of Antum, Northern Land visited by Mormon and Ammoron
 Arpad, City in Northwest Syria, currently called Tel Rifaat
 Assyria, Hostile Country in western Asia

B
 Babylon, Capital of Babylonia, in southwest Asia
 Bashan, Country east of the Jordan river
 Bethabara, Place on the east bank of the Jordan, where John was baptizing
 Boaz, Nephite retreat and battle ground
 City of Bountiful, Major Nephite city in the northeastern quadrant
 Land of Bountiful¹, Area in southern Arabia, near sea
 Land of Bountiful², Nephite territory north of Zarahemla

C
 Calno, Possibly town near Babylon
 Carchemish, Middle Eastern Land
 Chaldea, Hellenistic designation for a part of Babylonia
 City by the Sea, Nephite city on the west coast
 Hill Comnor, Hill near Valley of Shur
 Land and Valley of Corihor, Military Campground of the Army of Shiz
 City of Cumeni, Nephite city fought for by Helaman
 Hill Cumorah, Meeting place for battle, record depository

D
 Damascus, Capitol of Syria
 Land of David, Nephite land on the West Coast
 City of Desolation, Northern Nephite City
 Land of Desolation, North of the land Bountiful

E
 Garden of Eden, Original Home of Adam and Eve
 Edom, Arid region in southwest Israel
 Egypt, Land of Israel's captivity
 Elam, One of the oldest recorded civilizations
 Hill Ephraim, Hill in the Northern Region

F
 Land of First Inheritance, Near the Lehites' original landing point

G
 City of Gad, City destroyed at the crucifixion
 City of Gadiandi, City destroyed at the crucifixion
 City of Gadiomnah, City destroyed at the crucifixion
 Gallim, Probably in Benjamin, to the north of Jerusalem.
 Geba, Levitical city of Benjamin
 Gebim,  Small place north of Jerusalem
 City of Gid, City invaded by Lamanites and used as a prison camp to detain Nephites
 City of Gideon, Suburb of Zarahemla, location of battle, preaching, and other events
 Land and Valley of Gideon, East of river Sidon
 City of Gilgal, City destroyed at the crucifixion
 Valley of Gilgal, Jaredite battle region
 City of Gimgimno,  City destroyed at the crucifixion
 Gomorrah, Wicked City of the Old World

H
 Hagoth, Hagoth's Shipbuilding Site
 Hamath, Syrian city
 Land of Helam, Land inhabited by people of Alma1
 Hermounts, Wilderness on west and north
 Plains of Heshlon, Battleground of Coriantum and Shared
 Land of Heth, Land in the Northern Region
 Horeb, Mountains on the Sinai Peninsula

I
 Irreantum,,  Probably an arm of Indian Ocean off southeastern Arabia
 Land of Ishmael, Portion of land of Nephi
 Israel, The Promised Land of Moses' People

J
 City of Jacob, City destroyed at the crucifixion
 Jacobugath,  City of followers of Jacob
 City and Land of Jashon, Nephite retreat near Ammoron's record burial site
 Land of Jershon, Land on east by sea, south of land Bountiful
 Jerusalem¹, Chief city of Jews and surrounding area
 Jerusalem², Lamanite city and land in land of Nephi
 Jordan River, River in Palestine
 City of Jordan, Nephite retreat maintained by Mormon
 City of Josh, City destroyed at the crucifixion
 Land of Joshua, Land in borders west, by seashore
 Judah, Southern kingdom of Israelites
 City of Judea, Nephite city

K
 City of Kishkumen, Wicked city destroyed at the crucifixion

L
 Laish, Northernmost town of the Kingdom of Israel
 City of Laman, City destroyed at the crucifixion
 River Laman, River emptying into Red Sea
 Lebanon, Middle Eastern Country
 City of and Land of Lehi¹, Land adjoining land of Morianton and containing city of Lehi
 Land of Lehi², Apparently the entire land south
 City of and Land of Lehi-Nephi, Also called land of Nephi, of which it is a part
 City of Lemuel, Lamanite city
 Valley of Lemuel, Lehite campsite near borders of Red Sea

M
 Madmenah, Town in Benjamin, north of Jerusalem
 City of Manti, Chief city in land of Manti
 Hill of Manti, Near city of Zarahemla
 Land of Manti, Most southerly land of Nephites
 Melek, Nephite land west of Sidon
 Michmash, Town of Benjamin east of Bethel
 Middoni, Lamanite land, location of Lamanite prison
 Land of Midian, Lamanite land east of Lehi-Nephi
 Migron, Small place north of Jerusalem
 Minon, Nephite land on west bank of river Sidon
 Moab, Land of the Moabites, Israelite rivals
 City of Mocum, City destroyed at the crucifixion
 Moriancumer, Mesopotamian coastal region
 City of and Land of Morianton, Area settled by Morianton²
 Moriantum, Nephite area
 Forest of Mormon, Near waters of Mormon
 Place of Mormon, Region near city of Lehi-Nephi
 Waters of Mormon, Baptismal waters for over 200 Nephites
 Land of Moron, North of the great land of Desolation
 Moroni's Camp, Nephite Military Post
 City of and Land of Moroni, In southeast of Nephite lands
 City of Moronihah, Iniquitous Nephite city
 City of Mulek, Nephite city south of Bountiful

N
 Nahom, Place in Arabian desert
 Land of Naphtali, Israelite Territory
 Narrow Neck, By the west sea - led into the land northward
 Narrow Pass, Led by the sea into the land northward
 Narrow Strip of Wilderness, Ran from the sea east to the sea west
 Nazareth, City of Christ's childhood
 City of Nehor, Battleground for Corihor and Shule
 City of Nephi, City established by Nephi, later occupied by Lamanites, Zeniffites
 Land of Nephi, Land established by Nephi, later occupied by Lamanites, Zeniffites
 City of Nephihah, Nephite refuge captured and lost by the Lamanites
 Plains of Nephihah, Near the city of Nephihah
 Nephite Refuge, Location for Nephite centralization
 Valley of Nimrod, In Mesopotamia
 City and Land of Noah, In land of Zarahemla, near Ammonihah. It was here, in 72 BC by the Nephite calendar, that the Lamanites, under the command of Lamanite king Amalickiah, attacked the Nephites.  No Nephites died, but over a thousand Lamanites died, including all their chief captains.

O
 Ogath,,  Place near hill Ramah
 City of Omner, Nephite city by seashore on east borders
 Onidah, Gathering place for dissatisfied Lamanites
 Hill Onidah, In land of Antionum
 Onihah, City destroyed at the crucifixion

P
 Palestina, Middle Eastern Land Neighboring Israel
 Pathros, Location in upper Egypt

R
 Hill Ramah, Jaredite name for Hill Cumorah
 Ramath, Assyrian city destroyed by divine decree
 Hill Riplah, East of river Sidon, near land of Manti
 Waters of Ripliancum, Aquatic Region in the Land Northward

S
 Salem, Ancient name for Jerusalem
 Samaria, Middle Eastern Country
 Waters of Sebus,, Watering place in land of Ishmael
 Shazer, Lehite rest stop in Arabia
 Shelem, Mountain in Mesopotamia
 City of and Land of Shem², Nephite land north of Antum and Jashon
 Land of Shemlon,, Region bordering on land of Lehi-Nephi
 Sherrizah,, Nephite stronghold conquered by Lamanites
 Waters of Shiloah,, Pool near Jerusalem1
 City of and Land of Shilom, Small region next to land of Lehi-Nephi
 Hill Shim, Hill in the land Northward
 Shimnilom,, City in the Land of Nephi
 Shinar, Ancient name for Mesopotamia
 Valley of Shurr), Coriantumr's base camp
 Land of Sidom,, City near Ammonihah where Zeezrom, Alma and Amulek retreat
 Sidon River, Major river flowing through the land of Zarahemla
 Mount Sinai, Mountain where Moses received the Ten Commandments
 Sinim,,  Distant land, possibly China
 Siron,, City near Antionum where Corianton meets Isabel
 Sodom, Wicked City of the Old World
 Syria, Middle Eastern Country

T
 Tarshish, Possibly the city Tarsus
 City of Teancum, By seashore near city of Desolation
 Tower of Babel, Near Original Home of the Jaredites

W
 Wilderness, Various places

Z
 City of Zarahemla, Major capital of Nephites from about 200 B.C. to A.D. 200
 Land of Zarahemla, A general reference to the area near the city of Zarahemla
 Land of Zebulun, Israelite Territory
 City of Zeezrom, Nephite city on southwest frontier
 Mount Zerin,,  Mountain, Presumably in Mesopotamia
 Zion, City of God

Proposed map

See also
 List of Book of Mormon groups
 List of Book of Mormon people
 List of Book of Mormon prophets
List of Mormon place names

References

 
Places